Liam O'Donnell (born April 12, 1982) is an American film director, producer, writer and special effects artist.

Career
O'Donnell has worked with Greg and Colin Strause, the owners of Hydraulx VFX, since 2005. Most notable movies, he was responsible for visual effects, are Aliens vs. Predator: Requiem, Iron Man 2 and The Bay.

O'Donnell wrote and produced the 2010 film Skyline.

In June 2021, it was announced O'Donnell will direct The Wreck, a shark attack thriller about a group of old college friends who reunite on a Caribbean scuba diving trip exploring the wreckage of a WWII battleship and find themselves trapped inside the underwater labyrinth of rusted metal surrounded by great white sharks. The movie is set to film in Malta in September 2021.

Filmography

Films

As producer

As director

References

External links

Special effects people
Science fiction film directors
1982 births
Living people